Salhawas is a village in Rewari district, Haryana, India.

Demographics
As of 2011 India census, Salhawas had a population of 1139 in 186 households. Males (598) constitute 52.5%  of the population and females (541) 47.49%. Salhawas has an average literacy(660) rate of 57.94%, lower than the national average of 74%: male literacy(428) is 64.84%, and female literacy(232) is 35.15% of total literates (232). In Salhawas, 17.2% of the population is under 6 years of age (196).

Adjacent villages
Masani
Rasgan
Dungarwas
Hansaka
Jaunawas (Jonawas)
Nikhri
Kanhawas
Salhawas
Ashiaki
Majra Gurdas

References

Villages in Rewari district